Llallawavis scagliai (magnificent bird of Scaglia) is a large, extinct predatory bird from Pliocene Argentina. Its fossil is the most complete fossil of a phorusrhacid (or "terror bird") yet found.

Description 
 
The fossil, discovered in 2010 in sediment among the cliffs above La Estafeta beach in the lower part of the Playa Los Lobos Allo Formation, contains the complete palate, complete trachea, skull, voice box, and eye bones.

Habitat 
The joints separating the skulls bones were fused, unlike modern birds, and that may have helped it batter prey. CT scans of its inner ear show that it could only hear frequencies between about 380 and 4230 hertz, and probably had a deep voice to match.

The below cladogram is simplified after the analysis of Degrange et al. (2015).

References 

Phorusrhacidae
Pliocene birds of South America
Chapadmalalan
Neogene Argentina
Fossils of Argentina
Fossil taxa described in 2015